The Opposite Sex and How to Live with Them is a 1993 American romantic comedy film directed by Matthew Meshekoff and written by Noah Stern. The film stars Arye Gross, Courteney Cox, Kevin Pollak, Julie Brown, Mitchell Ryan and Mitzi McCall. The film was released on March 26, 1993, by Miramax Films.

Plot
David meets Carrie at a bar where he and his friend Eli are trying to pick up girls. They seem to like each other at first glance but are reluctant to approach each other because neither seems to show much interest. Fate seems to have had other plans though because they soon meet again at a baseball game; and thanks to Carrie's friend/roommate Zoe, David gets her number and asks her out. Soon they start dating.

Throughout the story, either Eli, Zoe, David or Carrie break the fourth wall to express their inner thoughts and feelings.

Carrie and David's relationship grows from cheap dates to spending nights at the other person's place to the formation of an emotional connection. A sexual encounter at Carrie's workplace soon leads to them being convinced by some kids that they should move in together and the two suddenly confess their love for one another. This devastates Eli as he fears losing his childhood friend.

Soon after moving into David's apartment, rigorous meetings/interrogation sessions with each other's parents take place.

Eli calls David one night and reminds him of his deep-rooted fear Of missing out as well as his fear of commitment, which results in Carrie and David growing apart and eventually leads to the two breaking up.

After they both go on dates with people they perceive to be their "perfect match", David and Carrie realize how much they miss each other and how truly in love they were, leading to their eventual patch up.

Soon after getting back together, David and Carrie often find themselves being compared to older, married couples, emphasis on the "married" part. This causes David to have a nightmare about Carrie marrying another man and he decides to propose to her in the same bar where they first met.

On their wedding day during two heart-to-heart conversations between the bride, groom and their respective friends, it is revealed that Carrie has doubts about her identity after marriage and how things will change to which Zoe reassures her with stories about her own life life as a married woman, mother, etc. It is also revealed during the talk between David and Eli that Eli's indifference toward David's relationship was purely fueled by the worry that Carrie might not be the one David is meant to end up with, and that Eli also has a desire to get married someday...with the right person of course.

The story comes to an end with Carrie and David's wedding being overseen by officiants of both the Christian and Jewish faith.

Cast 

Arye Gross as David Crown
Courteney Cox as Carrie Davenport
Kevin Pollak as Eli
Julie Brown as Zoe
Mitchell Ryan as Kenneth Davenport 
Mitzi McCall as Freida Crown
Susan Cookson as Giselle Davenport
Philip Bruns as Irv Crown 
Jack Carter as Rabbi
Tess Foltyn as Hanna
David DeCastro as Beer Vendor
Donald Brown as Crackerjack Vendor
Aaron Lustig as Movie Bully
Connie Sawyer as Waitress From Hell
Steven Brill as George/French TV Announcer
Davis Guggenheim as Pitcher
Craig Alan Edwards as First Baseman
Rob Youngblood as Adam
John DeMita as Chipper
Lisa Waltz as Lizbeth
Kimberlin Brown as Leeza
Tony Canario as Cute Guy 
Kevin West as Tour Guide
Justin Shenkarow as Buddy 
Mindy Mittleman as Cindy
Jensen Daggett as Cheerleader
Amanda Foreman as Waitress
Kimber Sissons as Tracy
Larry Poindexter as Carrie's Date
Frank Birney as Priest
Johnny Most as Basketball Announcer

Reception
The film received negative reviews from critics. It currently holds a rating of 7% on Rotten Tomatoes based on 14 reviews.

References

External links
 
 

1993 films
1993 directorial debut films
1993 romantic comedy films
American romantic comedy films
Films scored by Ira Newborn
Films set in Boston
Films shot in Boston
Miramax films
1990s English-language films
1990s American films